Mousa Al-Awadi (born July 20, 1985 in Amman, Jordan) is a Jordanian professional basketball player who currently plays for Al Jubeha club (basketball team)]] of the [jordan premier basketball league]. He also is a member of the Jordan national basketball team.

Career
Al-Awadi competed with the Jordanian team at the FIBA Asia Championship 2007 and FIBA Asia Championship 2009.  In 2009, Al-Awadi helped the Jordanian team to a national best third-place finish by averaging 4.8 points per game off the bench for the team.  The third-place finish meant that Jordan qualified for its first ever FIBA World Championship.

References

1985 births
Living people
Asian Games competitors for Jordan
Basketball players at the 2014 Asian Games
Jordanian men's basketball players
Shooting guards
Sportspeople from Amman
2010 FIBA World Championship players
2019 FIBA Basketball World Cup players